First Boy is a children's novel published in 2005 by Gary Schmidt. It was a Mark Twain Award nominee for the 2007–2008 year.

Plot summary
Dragged into the political turmoil of a presidential election year, fourteen-year-old Cooper Jewett, who has run a New Hampshire dairy farm since his grandfather's death, stands up for himself and makes it clear whose first boy he really is. Cooper never knew his parents and his birth certificate is blacked out. Who is Cooper Jewett really? Nobody knows.

Characters
Cooper Jewett
Mrs. Perley
Mr. Searle

References

2005 American novels
American children's novels
Novels about elections
Novels set in New Hampshire
Henry Holt and Company books
2005 children's books